The City of Maitland is a local government area in the lower Hunter region of New South Wales, Australia.  The area is situated adjacent to the New England Highway and the Hunter railway line.

The Mayor of the City of Maitland is Cr. Philip Penfold , an Independent politician.

Proposed amalgamation
A 2015 review of local government boundaries by the NSW Government Independent Pricing and Regulatory Tribunal recommended the merger of a number of adjoining councils. In the initial proposal, the City of Maitland was not included in any amalgam ation proposals. However, following the lodging of an alternate proposal by Mid-Coast Council Council to amalgamate the Gloucester, Great Lakes and Greater Taree councils, the NSW Minister for Local Government proposed a merger between the Dungog Shire with the City of Maitland. In February 2017, the NSW Government announced that it will not proceed with the proposed amalgamation.

Demographics
At the 2011 census, there were  people in the City of Maitland local government area, of these 48.9 per cent were male and 51.1 per cent were female. Aboriginal and Torres Strait Islander people made up 3.5 per cent of the population, which was higher than the national and state averages of 2.5 per cent. The median age of people in the City of Maitland was 36 years, which was marginally lower than the national median of 37 years. Children aged 0 – 14 years made up 22.0 per cent of the population and people aged 65 years and over made up 12.7 per cent of the population. Of people in the area aged 15 years and over, 50.9 per cent were married and 11.8 per cent were either divorced or separated.

Population growth in the City of Maitland between the 2001 census and the 2006 census was 15.19 per cent; and in the subsequent five years to the 2011 census, population growth was 9.05 per cent. When compared with total population growth of Australia for the same periods, being 5.78 per cent and 8.32 per cent respectively, population growth in the City of Maitland local government area was significantly higher than the national average. The median weekly income for residents within the City of Maitland was approximately equal to the national average.

At the 2011 census, the proportion of residents in the City of Maitland local government area who stated their ancestry as Australian or Anglo-Celtic exceeded 82 per cent of all residents (national average was 65.2 per cent). In excess of 67% of all residents in the City of Maitland nominated a religious affiliation with Christianity at the 2011 census, which was significantly higher than the national average of 50.2 per cent. Meanwhile, as at the census date, compared to the national average, households in the City of Maitland local government area had a significantly lower than average proportion (4.7 per cent) where two or more languages are spoken (national average was 20.4 per cent); and a significantly higher proportion (93.2 per cent) where English only was spoken at home (national average was 76.8 per cent).

Council

Current composition and election method
Maitland City Council is composed of thirteen Councillors, including the Mayor, for a fixed four-year term of office. The Mayor is directly elected while the twelve other Councillors are elected proportionally as four separate wards, each electing three Councillors. The most recent election was held on 4 December 2021, and the makeup of the council, including the Mayor, is as follows.

Cr. Philip Penfold, an Independent, defeated the incumbent Cr. Loretta Baker in the 2021 mayoral election. The council consists of the following:

References